Knox County is a county located in the state of Maine, in the United States.  As of the 2020 census, the population was 40,607.  Its county seat is Rockland.  The county is named for American Revolutionary War general and Secretary of War Henry Knox, who lived in the county from 1795 until his death in 1806.  The county was established on April 1, 1860, and is the most recent county to be created in Maine.  It was carved from parts of Waldo and Lincoln counties. The Union Fair, started in 1868, began as the efforts of the North Knox Agricultural and Horticultural Society.

Geography
It is the second-smallest county in Maine by land area. It was originally part of the Waldo Patent.

Adjacent counties
Lincoln County – west
Waldo County – north
Hancock County – northeast

National protected areas
 Franklin Island National Wildlife Refuge
 Seal Island National Wildlife Refuge

Demographics

2000 census
At the 2000 census there were 39,618 people, 16,608 households, and 10,728 families living in the county.  The population density was 108 people per square mile (42/km2).  There were 21,612 housing units at an average density of 59 per square mile (23/km2).  The racial makeup of the county was 98.28% White, 0.24% Black or African American, 0.22% Native American, 0.36% Asian, 0.01% Pacific Islander, 0.12% from other races, and 0.78% from two or more races.  0.57% of the population were Hispanic or Latino of any race. 25.4% were of English, 12.2% Irish, 11.7% United States or American, 7.5% German and 5.7% French ancestry. 97.1% spoke English and 1.5% French as their first language.
Of the 16,608 households 28.30% had children under the age of 18 living with them, 52.20% were married couples living together, 9.00% had a female householder with no husband present, and 35.40% were non-families. 29.00% of households were one person and 12.70% were one person aged 65 or older.  The average household size was 2.31 and the average family size was 2.83.

The age distribution was 22.40% under the age of 18, 6.30% from 18 to 24, 27.40% from 25 to 44, 26.70% from 45 to 64, and 17.20% 65 or older.  The median age was 41 years. For every 100 females there were 95.20 males.  For every 100 females age 18 and over, there were 93.00 males.

The median household income was $36,774 and the median family income  was $43,819. Males had a median income of $30,704 versus $22,382 for females. The per capita income for the county was $19,981.  About 6.40% of families and 10.10% of the population were below the poverty line, including 11.90% of those under age 18 and 8.00% of those age 65 or over.

2010 census
At the 2010 census, there were 39,736 people, 17,258 households, and 10,662 families living in the county. The racial makeup of the county was 97.1% white, 0.5% black or African American, 0.5% Asian, 0.4% American Indian, 0.2% from other races, and 1.4% from two or more races. Those of Hispanic or Latino origin made up 0.8% of the population. In terms of ancestry, 31.3% were English, 19.0% were Irish, 12.8% were German, 6.9% were Scottish, and 5.9% were American.

Of the 17,258 households, 25.4% had children under the age of 18 living with them, 48.2% were married couples living together, 9.4% had a female householder with no husband present, 38.2% were non-families, and 31.0% of households were made up of individuals. The average household size was 2.22 and the average family size was 2.75. The median age was 46.2 years.

The median household income was $45,264 and the median family income  was $55,830. Males had a median income of $40,712 versus $29,732 for females. The per capita income for the county was $25,291. About 7.9% of families and 12.5% of the population were below the poverty line, including 16.5% of those under age 18 and 9.8% of those age 65 or over.

Politics
In 2012, Knox County voted 55% in favor of a measure to legalize same-sex marriage.

Voter registration

|}

Communities

City
Rockland (county seat)

Towns

Appleton
Camden
Cushing
Friendship
Hope
Isle au Haut
North Haven
Owls Head
Rockport
Saint George
South Thomaston
Thomaston
Union
Vinalhaven
Warren
Washington

Plantation
Matinicus Isle

Unorganized territories
Criehaven
Muscle Ridge Islands

Census-designated places
Camden
Thomaston

Other unincorporated villages
Glen Cove
Hibberts Corner
Port Clyde
West Rockport

Public buildings
An addition to the Knox County Courthouse designed by Scott Simons Architects was completed 2005. It is connected to an annex built in 1977 that is adjacent to the historic, original building that was finished in 1874.

See also
National Register of Historic Places listings in Knox County, Maine
Historical United States Census totals for Knox County, Maine

References

External links
 Official site of Knox County
 Knox County Charter
 Maine Genealogy: Knox County, Maine

 

 
Maine counties
1860 establishments in Maine
Populated places established in 1860